Breath of Life (1991) is a BAFTA Award-nominated British short film directed by Navin Thapar, written by Nasser Memarzia and Kulvinder Ghir, with Amir Korangy and Moshe Ivgy as the lead actors.  The film depicts a group of prisoners of conscience that have forged strong emotional bonds and share seemingly trivial aspirations in order to cling on to some semblance of hope, defiance and collective survival.

References

1991 short films
1991 films
British short films
1990s English-language films